Jules Migeon (1815–1868) was a French author, businessman and politician. He served in the Corps législatif from 1852 to 1859.

Early life
Jules Migeon was born on 7 February 1815 in Méziré, France. His father, Jean-Baptiste Migeon, was a businessman.

Migeon studied the Classics in Haut-Rhin and Paris.

Career
Migeon published short stories in Le Pionnier, a literary magazine, as early as 1844. He published his first novel, Louise, shortly after. Two years later, in 1846, he published, La France et ses institutions, a book about French institutions.

Migeon acquired the Zola Dam, built by François Zola, near Aix-en-Provence in 1853. It was dedicated in 1854.

Migeon was conservative. He served in the Corps législatif from 1852 to 1859, representing Haut-Rhin.

Migeon was a papal count.

Death
Migeon died on 20 March 1868 in Zug, Switzerland.

References

1815 births
1868 deaths
People from the Territoire de Belfort
Papal counts
Politicians from Bourgogne-Franche-Comté
Members of the National Legislative Assembly of the French Second Republic
Members of the 1st Corps législatif of the Second French Empire
Members of the 2nd Corps législatif of the Second French Empire
French male short story writers
French short story writers
French novelists
French businesspeople